José Antonio Ruiz Lopéz (born 17 April 1992), commonly known as Pirulo, is a Spanish professional footballer who plays as an attacking midfielder for ŁKS Łódź.

Club career

Spain
Born in Los Barrios, Cádiz, Andalusia, Pirulo joined Espanyol's youth setup in January 2009, after refusing to train with his previous club, Cádiz. He made his senior debut for the former's reserves in 2011, in Tercera División.

On 8 July 2012 Pirulo signed for another reserve team, Atlético Malagueño also in the fourth tier. The following year he moved to Segunda División B club L'Hospitalet, scoring six goals in 30 appearances as his side missed out promotion in the play-offs.

On 30 June 2014 Pirulo returned to the Pericos and its B-team, now in the third division. On 14 July 2015, he joined fellow league team Sabadell.

Senica
In July 2016, Pirulo signed a contract with Fortuna Liga club Senica, after impressing on a trial basis. He made his professional debut on 16 July, starting in a 0–1 home loss against Slovan Bratislava.

Cherno More
On 6 February 2017, Pirulo joined Bulgarian club Cherno More. He made his debut against CSKA Sofia in a 0–2 home defeat on 19 February. On 19 March 2017, Pirulo scored his first and only goal in a 3–1 away win over Neftochimic Burgas. On 29 May 2017, his contract was terminated by mutual consent.

References

External links
 Pirulo at FK Senica's official website 
 
 
 Pirulo profile at Futbalnet 

1992 births
Living people
People from Campo de Gibraltar
Sportspeople from the Province of Cádiz
Spanish footballers
Footballers from Andalusia
Association football midfielders
Segunda División B players
Tercera División players
RCD Espanyol B footballers
Atlético Malagueño players
CE L'Hospitalet players
CE Sabadell FC footballers
Slovak Super Liga players
FK Senica players
First Professional Football League (Bulgaria) players
PFC Cherno More Varna players
Real Balompédica Linense footballers
ŁKS Łódź players
Ekstraklasa players
I liga players
Spanish expatriate footballers
Spanish expatriate sportspeople in Slovakia
Expatriate footballers in Slovakia
Spanish expatriate sportspeople in Poland
Expatriate footballers in Poland
Spanish expatriate sportspeople in Bulgaria
Expatriate footballers in Bulgaria